The New Territories North  geographical constituency is one of the ten geographical constituencies in the elections for the Legislative Council of Hong Kong which elects two members of the Legislative Council using the single non-transferable vote (SNTV) system. The constituency covers North District and northern part of Yuen Long District in New Territories.

History
The constituency was created under the overhaul of the electoral system imposed by the Beijing government in 2021, replacing the North District of the New Territories East and northern part of Yuen Long District (Ha Tsuen, Ping Shan Central, Shing Yan, Tin Yiu, Tin Shing, Tsz Yau, Yiu Yau, Kingswood South, Shui Oi, Shui Wah, Chung Wah, Chung Pak, Kingswood North, Yuet Yan, Ching King, Fu Yan, Yat Chak, Tin Heng, Wang Yat, Ping Shan North, Fairview Park, San Tin) of the New Territories West constituency used from 1998 to 2021. A constituency with the same name were also created for the 1991 and 1995 elections in the late colonial period, while the 1991 constituency also elected two seats with each voter having two votes and the 1995 constituency a similar boundary.

Returning members

Election results

2020s

References 

Constituencies of Hong Kong
New Territories
Constituencies of Hong Kong Legislative Council
2021 establishments in Hong Kong
Constituencies established in 2021